Ryan Ford (born March 8, 1982) is a Canadian professional boxer and mixed martial artist. A professional competitor since 2007, Ford has also formerly competed for Bellator, the WSOF, the MFC, TFC, and the AFC.

Mixed martial arts career

Maximum Fighting Championship
Ford began his career with Maximum Fighting Championship, On February 22, 2008, at MFC 15 Ford defeated Pete Spratt via rear-naked choke in the second round.

On May 9, 2008, at MFC 16 Ford defeated CJ Fernandes via rear-naked choke submission in round one.

On July 25, 2008, at MFC 17 Ford was defeated by Pat Healy via arm-bar submission, the fight was for the MFC Welterweight Championship.

On September 28, 2008, at MFC 18 Ford defeated Laverne Clark via guillotine choke in the second round.

On February 20, 2009, at MFC 20 Ford was defeated by Pat Healy via split decision in a rematch for the MFC Welterweight Championship.

On September 10, 2010, at MFC 26 Ford was defeated by Douglas Lima via armbar submission in the second round.

On November 12, 2010, at MFC 27 Ford defeated Pete Spratt in a rematch via rear-naked choke submission.

Ford has twice left the Edmonton-based MFC organization due to contract disputes.

Independent promotions
Ford signed with the Edmonton-based promotion The Fight Club. On March 19, 2010, at TFC 10 Ford defeated former Ultimate Fighter finalist Tom Speer via rear-naked choke submission in round one on March 19, 2010, to retain the TFC Welterweight Championship.

On May 19, 2011, Ford fought UFC veteran Karo Parisyan at MMA Live 1 in London, Ontario, After the first two rounds, Ford caught Parisyan with a knee and cut his forehead, causing the doctor and referee to stop the fight giving Ford the win via doctor stoppage.

Aggression Fighting Championship
On June 10, 2011, Ford Returned to the Aggression MMA organization at AMMA 7: Confrontation defeating Nick Hinchcliffe in round three via TKO due to punches. On September 16, 2011, at AMMA 8: Unfinished Business, Ford was defeated by David Hulett via guillotine choke in round one. On February 11, 2012, Ford defeated Ricky Goodall at AMMA 9 via TKO due to elbows in round one.

On March 23, 2013, Ford fought for the renamed Aggression Fighting Championship promotion in Edmonton, Alberta. Ford defeated Brendan Tierney via KO in the second round at AFC 17.

Ford faced Ultimate Fighter vet Michael Hill on July 5, 2013, at AFC 19 for the AFC Welterweight Championship. Ford defeated Hill via rear-naked choke submission in the fifth round to win the AFC Welterweight Championship.

Bellator Fighting Championships
Ford signed with Bellator making his debut On May 4, 2012, at Bellator 67, Ford defeated Luis Santos via TKO due to knees and punches in the second round.

On November 2, 2012, at Bellator 79, Ford took on Kyle Baker at Casino Rama in Ontario, Ford won via unanimous decision.

World Series of Fighting
On December 5, 2013, it was announced that Ford signed a multi-fight deal with World Series of Fighting’s Canadian branch and is expected to debut under the WSOF banner in early 2014.

Ford is expected to make is WSOF debut at WSOF Canada 1 against Joel Powell for the inaugural WSOF Canadian Welterweight Championship. Ford won via knockout due to a front kick and punches in just 53 seconds of round one to win the WSOF Canadian Welterweight Championship.

Ford was scheduled to fight Bristol Marunde on June 7, 2014, at WSOF Canada 2. He pulled out after getting injured during training.

Ford faced Jake Shields in the main event at WSOF 14 on October 11, 2014, in Edmonton, Alberta Canada. Although he dropped Shields early in the fight with a left hand, Ford eventually lost the fight via rear naked choke submission in the first round.

Ford was set to face Yushin Okami in a Middleweight bout for the main event of WSOF 21 on June 5, 2015. However, Ford announced that he had to pull out of the June fight with Okami.

Unified MMA
On January 6, 2022, it was announced that Ford would be making his return to MMA on March 4, 2022, at Unified MMA 43 against Dawond Pickney.  He won the bout via triangle choke in the second round.

Ford made his return on May 27, 2022, at Unified MMA 45 facing off against Robert Hale for the Unified MMA Super Welterweight Championship. He won the fight via first round technical knockout.

Professional boxing career
Ford made his professional boxing debut on February 13, 2010, winning a four-round majority decision over Willard Lewis. On June 8, 2015, it was announced that Ford was retiring from MMA to focus on a career in professional boxing.

Ford fought on September 11, 2015, against Gary Kopas competing for the KO Boxing promotion. He won a four-round unanimous decision.

On September 20, 2015, it was announced that Ford will fight on October 16, 2015, against Antonio Dos Santos at Dekada Premier Fight Night. He won via knockout in the first round.

On November 13, 2015, it was announced that Ford will fight on December 4, 2015, against Alvaro Enriquez for the KO Boxing promotion. He won via technical knockout in the second round.

On February 22, 2016, it was announced that Ford will fight on March 11, 2016, against David Whittom for the KO Boxing promotion. He won via knockout in the first round.

On April 22, 2016, Ford faced former Thailand Olympic Gold and Silver medalist Manus Boonjumnong. He won via fourth-round technical knockout after his opponent was no longer able to continue entering the fifth round.

On September 9, 2016, Ford faced former World Boxing Council Cruiserweight Champion Victor Manuel Palacios for the KO Boxing promotion. He won the fight via unanimous decision.

On October 29, 2016, it was announced that Ford would face IBO Asia Pacific Light Heavyweight Champion Sam Rapira on February 17, 2017, for the Vacant UBO Light Heavyweight Championship. He won the fight via TKO to become the UBO World Light Heavyweight Champion.

On November 10, 2016, it was announced that Ford would be facing Mario Baeza for the KO Boxing promotion on December 2, 2016. He won the fight via unanimous decision.

On March 13, 2017, it was announced that Ford would be making the first defense of his title against former WBC Asian World Champion New Zealand fighter Robert Berridge on May 27, 2017. He won the fight via technical decision after an accidental head butt.

On August 10, 2017, it as announced that Ford would be facing British fighter WBO European Light Heavyweight Champion Anthony Yarde on September 16, 2017, for the vacant WBO Intercontinental Light Heavyweight Championship. On August 25, 2017, it was announced that the fight was canceled after a contract dispute.

On September 6, 2017, it was announced that Ford would be facing Joaquin Murrieta on September 9, 2017, for Rixta Promotions. He won the fight via corner stoppage in the fourth round.

On November 17, 2017, it was announced that Ford would be facing former WBA Super Middleweight Champion Fedor Chudinov for the WBA International Super Middleweight Title on December 9, 2017. Ford lost via twelve round unanimous decision.

On February 9, 2019, Ford faced off against Nick Hannig for the vacant WBC International light heavyweight title. Ford lost via twelve round unanimous decision.

On April 6, 2019, Ford faced off against German Olympic boxer Serge Michel. Ford won the fight via knockout to win the WBC International Silver light heavyweight title.

On August 31, 2019, Ford faced undefeated Joshua Buatsi which ended in controversy after what appeared to be a low shot from Buatsi, the fight was stopped awarding Buatsi the victory via knockout

Personal life
Ford is married to wife Nina & has two children, a son, Ryan Jr. and a daughter, Bella. He is the son of retired professional boxer Al Ford.

In 2003, Ford was the participant in an armed robbery home invasion. During the robbery, Ford used a knife on the home owner and cut the victim's left index and middle finger to the bone. The victim's wife and two children were present in the house at the time.  Ford served a four-year sentence for this crime.

Championships and accomplishments

Boxing
Universal Boxing Organization
UBO World Light Heavyweight Championship (One time)
World Boxing Council
WBC International Silver Light Heavyweight Championship (One time)

Mixed martial arts
Aggression Fighting Championship
AFC Welterweight Championship (One time)
The Fight Club
TFC Welterweight Championship (One time)
Interim TFC Welterweight Championship (One time)
Unified MMA
Unified Super Welterweight Championship (One time, current)
World Series of Fighting: Canada
WSOF Canadian Welterweight Championship (One time)

Mixed martial arts record

|-
| Win
| align=center| 24–5
| Robert Hale
| TKO (punches)
| Unified MMA 45
| 
| align=center|1
| align=center|3:56
| Enoch, Alberta, Canada
| 
|-
| Win
| align=center| 23–5
| Dawond Pickney
| Submission (triangle choke)
| Unified MMA 43
| 
| align=center|2
| align=center|4:01
| Enoch, Alberta, Canada
| 
|-
| Loss
| align=center| 22–5
| Jake Shields
| Submission (rear-naked choke)
| WSOF 14
| 
| align=center| 1
| align=center| 4:29
| Edmonton, Alberta, Canada
| 
|-
| Win
| align=center| 22–4
| Joel Powell
| KO (front kick and punches)
| WSOF Canada 1
| 
| align=center| 1
| align=center| 0:53
| Edmonton, Alberta, Canada
| 
|-
| Win
| align=center| 21–4
| Michael Hill
| Submission (rear-naked choke)
| AFC 19
| 
| align=center| 5
| align=center| 4:32
| Edmonton, Alberta, Canada
| 
|-
| Win
| align=center| 20–4
| Brendan Tierney
| KO (punch)
| AFC 17
| 
| align=center| 2
| align=center| 3:11
| Edmonton, Alberta Canada
| 
|-
| Win
| align=center| 19–4
| Kyle Baker
| Decision (unanimous)
| Bellator 79
| 
| align=center| 3
| align=center| 5:00
| Rama, Ontario Canada
| 
|-
| Win
| align=center| 18–4
| Luis Santos
| TKO (knee and punches)
| Bellator 67
| 
| align=center| 2
| align=center| 1:24
| Rama, Ontario Canada
| 
|-
| Win
| align=center| 17–4
| Ricky Goodall
| TKO (elbows)
| AMMA 9: Aggression MMA 9
| 
| align=center| 1
| align=center| 3:37
| Edmonton, Alberta Canada
| 
|-
| Loss
| align=center| 16–4
| David Hulett
| Submission (guillotine choke)
| AMMA 8: Unfinished Business
| 
| align=center| 1
| align=center| 1:35
| Edmonton, Alberta Canada
| 
|-
| Win
| align=center| 16–3
| Nick Hinchliffe
| TKO (punches)
| AMMA 7: Confrontation
| 
| align=center| 3
| align=center| 0:18
| Edmonton, Alberta Canada
| 
|-
| Win
| align=center| 15–3
| Karo Parisyan
| TKO (doctor stoppage)
| JEG: MMA Live 1
| 
| align=center| 3
| align=center| 1:26
| London, Ontario Canada
| 
|-
| Win
| align=center| 14–3
| Johnny Davis
| TKO (punches)
| AMMA 6: Edmonton
| 
| align=center| 2
| align=center| 2:06
| Edmonton, Alberta Canada
| 
|-
| Win
| align=center| 13–3
| Pete Spratt
| Submission (rear-naked choke)
| MFC 27
| 
| align=center| 2
| align=center| 3:07
| Edmonton, Alberta Canada
| 
|-
| Loss
| align=center| 12–3
| Douglas Lima
| Submission (armbar)
| MFC 26
| 
| align=center| 2
| align=center| 0:48
| Edmonton, Alberta Canada
| 
|-
| Win
| align=center| 12–2
| Tom Speer
| Submission (rear-naked choke)
| TFC 10: High Voltage
| 
| align=center| 1
| align=center| 4:29
| Edmonton, Alberta Canada
| 
|-
| Win
| align=center| 11–2
| John Walsh
| KO (punches)
| TFC 9: Total Chaos
| 
| align=center| 1
| align=center| 0:13
| Edmonton, Alberta Canada
| 
|-
| Win
| align=center| 10–2
| Markhaile Wedderburn
| Submission (rear-naked choke)
| TFC 8: Salvation
| 
| align=center| 1
| align=center| 1:24
| Edmonton, Alberta Canada
| 
|-
| Win
| align=center| 9–2
| Dave Mazany
| TKO (punches)
| TFC 7: Full Throttle
| 
| align=center| 1
| align=center| 0:28
| Edmonton, Alberta Canada
| 
|-
| Loss
| align=center| 8–2
| Pat Healy
| Decision (split)
| MFC 20
| 
| align=center| 5
| align=center| 5:00
| Edmonton, Alberta Canada
| 
|-
| Win
| align=center| 8–1
| Nabil Khatib
| Decision (unanimous)
| Raw Combat: Redemption
| 
| align=center| 3
| align=center| 5:00
| Calgary, Alberta Canada
| 
|-
| Win
| align=center| 7–1
| Laverne Clark
| Submission (guillotine choke)
| MFC 18: Famous
| 
| align=center| 2
| align=center| 2:30
| Edmonton, Alberta Canada
| 
|-
| Loss
| align=center| 6–1
| Pat Healy
| Submission (armbar)
| MFC 17: Hostile Takeover
| 
| align=center| 3
| align=center| 3:00
| Edmonton, Alberta Canada
| 
|-
| Win
| align=center| 6–0
| CJ Fernandes
| Submission (rear-naked choke)
| MFC 16: Anger Management
| 
| align=center| 1
| align=center| 2:32
| Edmonton, Alberta Canada
| 
|-
| Win
| align=center| 5–0
| Pete Spratt
| Submission (rear-naked choke)
| MFC 15: Rags to Riches
| 
| align=center| 2
| align=center| 4:01
| Edmonton, Alberta Canada
| 
|-
| Win
| align=center| 4–0
| Mike Sorenson
| TKO (punches)
| MFC 14: High Rollers
| 
| align=center| 2
| align=center| 0:51
| Edmonton, Alberta Canada
| 
|-
| Win
| align=center| 3–0
| Adil Abbas
| Submission (rear-naked choke)
| ECC 6: Hometown Heroes
| 
| align=center| 1
| align=center| 1:21
| Halifax, Nova Scotia Canada
| 
|-
| Win
| align=center| 2–0
| Randy Valette
| TKO (punches and elbows)
| MFC 13: Lucky 13
| 
| align=center| 1
| align=center| 2:07
| Edmonton, Alberta Canada
| 
|-
| Win
| align=center| 1–0
| Aaron Gallant
| TKO (punches)
| MFC 12: High Stakes
| 
| align=center| 2
| align=center| 4:15
| Edmonton, Alberta Canada
|

Professional boxing record

References

External links

 Ryan Ford UBO Profile
 Official Website

1982 births
Living people
Canadian male mixed martial artists
Canadian male boxers
Cruiserweight boxers
Light-heavyweight boxers
Super-middleweight boxers
Welterweight mixed martial artists
Mixed martial artists utilizing boxing
World Boxing Council champions
World light-heavyweight boxing champions
Black Canadian boxers
Sportspeople from Edmonton